Plagiobothrys strictus is a rare species of flowering plant in the borage family known by the common name Calistoga popcornflower. It is endemic to Napa County, California, where it is known from only two small locations near Calistoga.

Description
This is an annual herb growing erect 10 to 40 centimeters tall. It is mostly hairless except for the sepals, which have some rough hairs. The leaves are located along the stem and measure 4 to 9 centimeters long. The inflorescence is made up of paired branches bearing several five-lobed white flowers each about half a centimeter wide. The fruit is a ribbed nutlet 1 or 2 millimeters long.

Distribution and habitat
It grows in wet grassy habitat kept moist by runoff from hot springs and pools. The combined area of land containing the two populations was estimated to be less than 80 square meters in 1990. The species is threatened by the disturbance of its grassland habitat; both populations are on privately owned, unprotected land, one next to a small airport.

Endangered status
Plagiobothrys strictus is a federally listed endangered species of the United States.

References

External links
Jepson Manual Treatment

strictus
Endemic flora of California
Natural history of the California chaparral and woodlands
Natural history of Napa County, California
Endemic flora of the San Francisco Bay Area